In cricket, a five-wicket haul (also known as a "five-for" or "fifer") refers to a bowler taking five or more wickets in a single innings. This is regarded as a notable achievement, especially in T20 cricket where a bowler can bowl a maximum of only 24 balls (4 overs). The Indian Premier League (IPL) is a professional Twenty20 cricket league in India, which has been held annually since its first season in 2008. In the fifteen seasons played, twenty-eight five-wicket hauls have been taken by different bowlers, only two five-wicket hauls have been taken outside India. Players from eleven of the thirteen teams have taken five-wicket hauls; Pune Warriors India and Kochi Tuskers Kerala are the only franchises for which a player has not taken a five-wicket haul.

The first five-wicket haul was taken by Sohail Tanvir of the Rajasthan Royals against the Chennai Super Kings on 4 May 2008. He finished the game with 6 wickets. The most economical five-wicket haul was taken by Anil Kumble of the Royal Challengers Bangalore, who claimed five wickets with an economy rate of 1.57 in the 2009 season. Arshdeep Singh of the Punjab Kings took the least economical five-wicket haul, 5/32 bowling with an economy rate of 8.00 in 2021. Anil Kumble is the oldest bowler to take a five-wicket haul, achieving the feat at the age of 38, while Jaydev Unadkat is the youngest, he was 21 when he took his first five-for in 2013.

James Faulkner and Jaydev Unadkat are the only bowlers to take multiple five-wicket hauls in the IPL Four five-wickets hauls have been taken by players of the Mumbai Indians, which is more than any other team. Sunrisers Hyderabad have had six five-wicket hauls against them, the highest for any team. Five five-wicket hauls have been taken at the Rajiv Gandhi International Cricket Stadium, the most for a single venue. Lakshmipathy Balaji, Andrew Tye and Jaydev Unadkat are the only bowlers to take a hat-trick and a five-wicket haul in the same match, later two achieving the feat during the 2017 season, whereas Alzarri Joseph and Tye are the only bowlers to take a five-wicket haul on their IPL debut.

The best bowling figures in an IPL match was taken by Alzarri Joseph of Mumbai Indians who returned figures of 6/12 on his debut at the Rajiv Gandhi International Cricket Stadium, Hyderabad in 2019. Two other bowlers have taken a six-wicket haul in IPL – Sohail Tanvir of Rajasthan Royals in 2008 and Adam Zampa of Rising Pune Supergiant in 2016. As of 13 May 2022, the most recent five-wicket haul was taken by Jasprit Bumrah of the Mumbai Indians against the Kolkata Knight Riders.

The first part of this list includes all the five-wicket hauls taken in the IPL in chronological order. The second part of the list provides an overview of five-wicket hauls by IPL seasons, and the third part provides an overview of five-wicket hauls by IPL teams. All statistics are correct as of 10 November 2022. The list does not cover the games played by the IPL teams in other tournaments, such as the Champions League Twenty20, the British Asian Cup or the 2008 Kolkata Knight Riders tour of Australia.

Key

Five-wicket hauls

Season Overview 
2011 had the most five-wicket hauls, i.e. 4. No five-wicket hauls were taken in 2010, 2014 and 2015.

Team Overview 

Last updated: 10 November 2022

Notes

See also
 Purple Cap
 List of Indian Premier League centuries

References

External links
 

Indian cricket lists
Five-wicket hauls